Talisa Thomalla (born 5 May 2003) is a German pair skater. With her former skating partner, Robert Kunkel, she has competed at two World Junior Championships, placing 12th in 2017 and 7th in 2018. The two split in July 2019.

Programs 
(with Kunkel)

Competitive highlights 
JGP: Junior Grand Prix

Pairs with Kunkel

Ladies' singles

References

External links 
 

2003 births
German female pair skaters
Living people
Figure skaters from Berlin